Augusto Burchi (February 12, 1853 – 1919) was an Italian painter born in Florence.

Due to the indigence of his family, he was never formally trained in an academy. He worked under Gaetano Bianchi in many restorations and decorations in Florence, including in the Palazzo Vecchio and the Palazzo Medici-Riccardi. He worked in Cosenza with Federico Andreotti. Most of his painting was decorative and painted on site on walls or architecture.

References

19th-century Italian painters
Italian male painters
20th-century Italian painters
1853 births
1919 deaths
Painters from Florence
19th-century Italian male artists
20th-century Italian male artists